Ignacio Serapio Santiago Sr. (August 31, 1929 – December 2, 2015) was the governor of Bulacan from 1968 to 1986. He previously served as the mayor of Polo from 1956 until 1959, and again from 1964 to 1967, after the town was renamed to Valenzuela.

References

|-

|-

1957 births
2015 deaths
Governors of Bulacan
Mayors of Valenzuela, Metro Manila
Lakas–CMD (1991) politicians
People from Bulacan
Nacionalista Party politicians